Apostolepis quirogai, the Misiones  blackhead, is a species of snake in the family Colubridae. It is found in Argentina and Brazil.

References 

quirogai
Reptiles described in 1998
Reptiles of Argentina
Reptiles of Brazil